Seamus Augustine Cahill is an Irish born greyhound trainer. He is a British champion trainer and winner of the English Greyhound Derby.

Career
Seamus Cahill is from Mullinhoe, County Waterford and joined Catford Stadium in 1994 working for Paddy Milligan. In 1997 he took control of Milligan's Catford Stadium racing kennels in Keston and established himself as a leading trainer. He reached the final of the Laurels in his maiden year of 1997. One year later he moved from Catford to Wimbledon Stadium.

In 2002 finished runner-up in the 2002 English Greyhound Derby final with Call Me Baby and Shevchenko provided the first Classic win when sealing a Gold Collar triumph in the same year.

A short lived move to Walthamstow Stadium was followed by a switch to Brighton & Hove Greyhound Stadium before he won his first Trainers Championship at Wimbledon in 2008 and became Greyhound Trainer of the Year in 2010. He trained the brilliant sprinter and 2010 Greyhound of the Year Jimmy Lollie and has won four Grand National's.

His greatest achievement to date is winning the 2017 English Greyhound Derby with Astute Missile.

Awards
He was the winner of the Greyhound Trainer of the Year in 2010.

References 

British greyhound racing trainers
Irish greyhound racing trainers
Living people
1948 births